The Electoral district of South Yarra was an electoral district of the Legislative Assembly in the Australian colony — later, state — of Victoria.

Members for South Yarra

References

Former electoral districts of Victoria (Australia)
1889 establishments in Australia
1904 disestablishments in Australia